MS Cap San Diego is a general cargo ship, situated as a museum ship in Hamburg, Germany. Notable for her elegant silhouette, she was the last of a series of six ships known as the White Swans of the South Atlantic, and marked the apex of German-built general cargo ships before the advent of the container ship and the decline of Germany's heavy industry.

History
The Cap San Diego was built and launched by Deutsche Werft in 1961 for Hamburg Süd as the last of a series of six ships. The 159 m, 10000 dwt ship ran a regular schedule between Germany and South America, completing 120 round trips until 1981. After being sold and running under different names and under Spanish flag and also flags of convenience as a tramp trader, the run-down ship was scheduled for scrapping in 1986 when she was bought by the city of Hamburg.

Museum ship
The ship was restored mainly by the labour of enthusiasts and laid-off dock workers, and is kept operational to date. Most of the time, the Cap San Diego is moored at the port of Hamburg where visitors can access virtually all areas of the ship from the bridge to the engine. One of the cargo holds hosts temporary exhibitions. Passenger cabins can be booked for overnight stays. Several times a year, the ship leaves the harbour on her own power for trips mostly on the river Elbe or to Cuxhaven. In 2001, the ship was awarded the Maritime Heritage Award by the World Ship Trust, and in 2003 she was declared a protected item of cultural heritage under Hamburg law.

The ship participates in Hamburg's Long Night of Museums.

Sister ships 
The Cap San Diego had five sisterships:
 Cap San Nicolas
 Cap San Marco
 Cap San Lorenzo
 Cap San Augustin
 Cap San Antonio

Gallery

References

External links 

  
 Picture of the Cap San Diego

Merchant ships
Museums in Hamburg
Museum ships in Germany
Heritage sites in Hamburg
Tourist attractions in Hamburg
1961 ships